Alice Evans (born 1971) is an English actress.

Alice Evans may also refer to:
Alice Catherine Evans (1881–1975), American microbiologist
Alice Evans (footballer) (born 1994), Welsh international footballer
Alice Evans, a character in 3:10 to Yuma
Alice Evans, a character in Deadline